ATO Records (or According to Our Records) is an American independent record label based in New York City. The label was founded in 2000 by Dave Matthews and manager Coran Capshaw.

ATO's roster includes Brittany Howard, Black Pumas, Nick Hakim, Alabama Shakes, Rodrigo y Gabriela, Mattiel, Brandi Carlile, Joseph, King Gizzard and the Lizard Wizard, Hurray for the Riff Raff, Benjamin Booker, Lee Ann Womack, SOJA, Okkervil River, Blind Pilot, Old 97's, Drive-By Truckers, Primus, Margaret Glaspy, The Claypool Lennon Delirium, J Roddy Walston and the Business, and Amyl and the Sniffers.

The label also operates a sublabel, TBD Records, which was founded in 2007 and is best known for being the North American distributor for two Radiohead albums.

ATO is distributed in the US by Universal's Virgin Music Label & Artist Services and by PIAS Group in Europe.

History
Released in April 2012, Alabama Shakes’ debut album, Boys & Girls, was named as one of the year's best albums by many publications, including Rolling Stone.

The label's highest selling releases are White Ladder by David Gray and Sound & Color by Alabama Shakes, both of which have been certified Platinum - for sales of or exceeding 1 million units - by the Recording Industry Association of America. Three other releases have been certified Gold, for sales of 500,000 copies: In Rainbows by Radiohead, Boys & Girls by Alabama Shakes and A New Day at Midnight by David Gray.

ATO Records has won nine A2IM Liberia Awards and has been nominated over 20 times over the past five years. In 2020 the label won two award including the Best Metal Album (King Gizzard and the Lizard Wizard- Infest the Rats Nest), and Best Punk / Emo Album ( Amyl and the Sniffers - Amyl and the Sniffers).

ATO Records currently has seven nominations for The Americana Music Association Music Awards 2020, including Artist of the Year (Brittany Howard), Album of the Year (Brittany Howard), Song Of the Year ( Brittany Howard, and Drive-By Truckers), Duo/ Group of the Year (Black Pumas, and Drive-By Truckers), and Emerging Act of the Year (Black Pumas).

In November 2019 ATO Records artists received seven Grammy Nominations including Best Rock Song (Brittany Howard),  Best Rock Performance (Brittany Howard), Best R&B Song (Emily King), Best Engineered Album (Emily King), Best Contemporary Instrumental Album (Rodrigo y Gabriela), Best World Music Album (Altin Gün), and Best New Artist (Black Pumas).

ATO Records artists Rodrigo y Gabriela won the 2020 Grammy for Best Contemporary Instrumental Album for their album 'Mettavolution'.

Current artists

Former artists

See also
 List of record labels
 TBD Records, a sublabel of ATO

References

External links
 
 Interview with ATO Records General Manager Jon Salter

American record labels
vanity record labels